Strathtay is one of the twelve wards used to elect members of the Perth and Kinross Council. It elects three Councillors.

Councillors

Election Results

2022 Election
2022 Perth and Kinross Council election

2017 Election
2017 Perth and Kinross Council election

2012 Election
2012 Perth and Kinross Council election

2007 Election
2007 Perth and Kinross Council election

References

Wards of Perth and Kinross